The 11th Parliament of Tanzania was the legislature of Tanzania following the 2015 general election of Members of Parliament (MPs) to the unicameral National Assembly.

Graphical representation
The National Assembly has a total of 392 seats. This includes the 263 directly contested parliamentary constituencies.

List of MPs elected in the general election

Source:

List of appointed/nominated  MPs 
The following is a list of MPs appointed to special seats, or nominated by the President.

References

External links
 National Electoral Commission website

 
MP
Tanzania